Micky & the Motorcars is a Red Dirt band formed in Stanley, Idaho now based in Austin, Texas. They have released nine albums, including two live albums.

Background

The two founding members, Micky and Gary Braun, are the sons of outlaw country and western swing musician Muzzie Braun of Stanley, Idaho, and the brothers of Cody Braun and Willy Braun of the Texas based roots rock band Reckless Kelly. Both were part of Muzzie Braun & the Little Braun Brothers band, but formed their own band after Cody and Willy left to form Reckless Kelly. 

The band has its origin in Idaho, other founding members were their childhood friends Travis Hardy on drum and Mark McCoy on bass. They moved to Austin, Texas, where Joseph Deeb on lead guitar joined the band. The band had undergone a number of personnel changes since its founding. Mark McCoy left the band in 2011 and died in 2012 in a rafting accident. The band currently consists of Micky Braun (acoustic guitar, lead vocals), Gary Braun (lead & harmony vocals, guitars, mandolin, harmonica), Pablo Trujillo (lead guitar, pedal steel), Joe Fladger (bass), and Bobby Paugh (drums & percussion).

The band is also tied to the Texas Music movement and to a lesser extent the Oklahoma based Red Dirt Music Scene. Every year the band, in conjunction with their brothers and fellow musicians in Reckless Kelly, host the Braun Brothers Reunion in Idaho to celebrate the music and different artists from the genre.

Discography

Albums

Music videos

References

External links

 Band website
 

American country rock groups
Thirty Tigers artists
Musical groups established in 2002
Musical groups from Idaho